Undercover Men is a 1934 Canadian Western film directed by Sam Newfield and starring Charles Starrett, Adrienne Dore, Kenne Duncan and Wheeler Oakman. It was made in Toronto by the B-movie company Booth Productions. With a plot following the activities of the Royal Canadian Mounted Police, the film contains elements of a Northern.

In 1934 it was released as a quota quickie in the United Kingdom by MGM, as it was eligible for the British quota having been made within the British Empire.

Plot
For showing cowardice during a holdup, bank teller Bob Hunter is fired. He joins the Mounties and is assigned to look for those robbers. To have him work undercover, the Inspector's scheme is to have Bob supposedly kicked out of the Mounties.

Cast
 Charles Starrett as Constable Robert Hunter  
 Adrienne Dore as Betty Winton  
 Kenne Duncan as Blake Hardy (as Kenneth Duncan)
 Wheeler Oakman as Insp. A.R. McCrae  
 Eric Clavering as Madigan  
 Philip Brandon as Constable Jamie Jamieson (as Phil Brandon)
 Austin Moran as Sgt. Woods  
 Grace Webster as Mrs. Jamieson  
 Gilmore Young as Hyde  
 Elliott Lorraine as Mr. Winton  
 Wilbur Freeman as Hammond  
 Farnham Baxter as One-Eyed Ezra Hardy (as Farnham Barter)
 Muriel Deane as Lady in hardware store

References

Bibliography
 Pitts, Michael R. Western Movies: A Guide to 5,105 Feature Films. McFarland, 2012.

External links
 

1938 films
1930s English-language films
English-language Canadian films
1934 Western (genre) films
Canadian Western (genre) films
Films set in Canada
Films directed by Sam Newfield
Canadian black-and-white films
1930s Canadian films